See :Category:People from Chester
A list of notable people from Chester, England.

A
Russ Abbot, actor, musician.

B
Reg Barton, footballer.
Diana Beck, neurosurgeon.
Stan Bennion, footballer.
Chris Blackburn, footballer.
Emily Booth, actress.
Grenville Booth, footballer.
Sir Adrian Boult, orchestral conductor.
Thomas Brassey, civil engineer, railway contractor.
David Brett, footballer
Oswald Walters Brierly, Marine painter to Queen Victoria.
Robert Butt, footballer.

C
Hall Caine, (1853–1931), writer.
Randolph Caldecott, illustrator and artist.
Thomas E. Caldecott, politician.
Ray Carter, footballer.
Mark Cartwright, footballer.
Hugh B. Cave, author.
Gerald Cavendish Grosvenor, Duke of Westminster.
Mike Cecere, footballer.
Dave Challinor, footballer.
Ron Chesterman, musician.
Nigel Clutton, footballer.
Danny Collins (footballer), footballer.
Alec Croft, footballer.
Brian Croft, footballer.
Daniel Craig, actor (James Bond series).
Emma Cunniffe, actress.

D
John Douglas, (1830–1911), architect.

E
Simon Edge, novelist
Lloyd Ellams, footballer
David Evans (footballer)
David Evans (political official)
Robert Evans (footballer born 1885)

F
Tony Field (footballer born 1942).
Mike Fields, footballer.
Graham, Paul, and Ron Futcher, brothers who all played professional football.

G
Keith Griffiths, footballer.

H
Albert and Les Harley, footballing brothers.
Thomas Harrison, architect.
Tom Heaton, footballer.
Malcolm Hebden, actor.
Joe Hewitt, footballer.
Randle Holme - name shared by four successive generations of a family of herald painters.
A. S. Hornby, lexicographer.
Barry Horne, footballer.
Robert Spear Hudson (businessman).
Tom Hughes, actor

I
Jerry Ireland, footballer.

J
Eddie Johnson (English footballer).
Colin Jones (footballer).
Gary Jones (footballer born 1975).
Ray Jones (footballer born 1944).
Mike Jones (referee).

K
Hugh de Kevelioc, 3rd Earl of Chester.

L
Lee Latchford-Evans, singer.
Eric Lee (footballer).
Bert Lipsham, footballer.
Hugh Lloyd, actor.
Frank Eric Lloyd, author of Rhodesian Patrol.

M
Levi Mackin, footballer
George Mainwaring, merchant, mayor and MP
Lucy Meacock, broadcaster
Bob Mills (comedian)
Helen Modern, actress
William Monk R.E., etcher, woodcut engraver and painter
Steve Moore (footballer)
Alan Morris (footballer)
Jill Morris, diplomat
William De Morgan, potter and tile designer
Spangles Muldoon, DJ
Danny Murphy (footballer born 1977), footballer

O
Stephen Oliver, composer.
Michael Owen, footballer.

P
Mike Parry, broadcaster.
Ronald Pickup, actor.
John Port (the elder), judge.
Gary Potter, footballer.
Graham Pugh, footballer.

R
Basil Radford, actor.
Paul Raynor (footballer born 1957).
Bill Rigby footballer.
L. T. C. Rolt, biographer, engineer, writer and canal enthusiast.
Gary Roberts (footballer born 1984).
Gary Roberts (footballer born 1987).
Martin Roscoe (b. 1952), classical pianist.
Adam Rickitt  (singer and actor)

S
Ian Saltmarsh, cricketer. 
Alex Sanderson, Rugby union player.
Harry Smith, footballer.
George Spruce, footballer.
John Steiner, actor.
Ryan Shawcross, footballer.

T
Beatrice Tinsley, cosmologist.
Anthony Thwaite, poet.
Beth Tweddle, gymnast.
Martin Tyler, football commentator.

V
Danny Ventre, footballer.

W
Robert Wilcox (martyr).
Helen Willetts, weather presenter and former international badminton player.
Brian Woodall, footballer.

Chester